Jay Sterner Hammond (July 21, 1922 – August 2, 2005) was an American politician of the Republican Party, who served as the fourth governor of Alaska from 1974 to 1982. Hammond was born in Troy, New York and served as a Marine Corps fighter pilot in World War II with the Black Sheep Squadron. In 1946, he moved to Alaska where he worked as a bush pilot. Hammond served as a state representative from 1959 to 1965 and as a state senator from 1967 to 1973. From 1972 until 1974 he was the mayor of the Bristol Bay Borough. Then, in 1974, he was elected governor of Alaska. He oversaw the creation of the Alaska Permanent Fund in 1976, which, since the early 1980s, has paid annual dividends to Alaska residents. He advocated for fiscal responsibility. When his tenure as governor was over, he continued to be active in public life. He advocated for environmentally and fiscally responsible government and individual civic responsibility. From 1985 to 1992 he hosted a television series called Jay Hammond's Alaska. He wrote three autobiographies.

Early life
Jay Sterner Hammond was born in Troy, New York in 1922.  Hammond studied petroleum engineering at Penn State University, where he was a member of Triangle Fraternity. He later served as a Marine Corps fighter pilot in World War II with the Black Sheep Squadron, and in China, until 1946. That year, Hammond moved to Alaska where he worked as a bush pilot and earned a degree in biological sciences at the University of Alaska.

Hammond had one daughter, Wendy, with his first wife, but that marriage ended in divorce. In 1952, Hammond married his second wife, Bella Gardiner, with whom he had two daughters, Heidi and Dana.

Political career

Alaska Legislature

Hammond served as a state representative from 1959 to 1965 and as a state senator from 1967 to 1973. Hammond served in the 1st Alaska State Legislature as an independent, joining thirty-four Democrats and five Republicans in the forty-member House.  At the time, Hammond believed that a Republican could not be elected in that particular time and place, but that he could not envision running as a Democrat on account of his upbringing and background.  He did serve as a Republican in subsequent legislatures, however.  He was Senate President in his final two years in the legislature.

Bristol Bay Borough

Hammond was the mayor of the Bristol Bay Borough from 1972 to 1974.  He also served as the borough's manager during his time away from the legislature in the 1960s.

Governor of Alaska

Hammond was elected governor in 1974 in a close result over incumbent William A. Egan.  The race was complicated by two major factors, amongst others.  One was a reversal of roles of sorts, where Hammond and his running mate Lowell Thomas Jr. were identified as conservationists, confusing and splitting the traditional party base.  The other was the appearance, for the first time, of a substantial third-party candidate, Fairbanks miner and real estate developer Joe Vogler.  Vogler's open contempt for the environmental movement created a further voter rift which no doubt helped Hammond.

As governor during the biggest economic boom in Alaska's history, the construction of the Trans-Alaska Pipeline System, Hammond oversaw the creation of the Alaska Permanent Fund.  The concept of the Permanent Fund, originally championed in 1969 by then-governor Keith Miller and Anchorage Times publisher and editor Robert Atwood on the eve of the Prudhoe Bay oil lease sale, lay dormant for years as a result of the legislature spending the proceeds of the lease sale and construction delays associated with the pipeline.  During his first term as governor, Hammond, along with a young state representative from Kenai named Hugh Malone, conceived a program to invest oil royalties to cover future state budget shortfalls as well as create a long-term savings account.  Alaska voters approved a constitutional amendment establishing the Permanent Fund in 1976, one of the rare exceptions to the constitutional intent of not dedicating funds for a specific purpose.

Since the early 1980s, the Permanent Fund has paid annual dividends to Alaska residents, under a program in which credit has been variously given to, or taken by, Hammond, Malone, Libertarian state representative Dick Randolph and numerous other Alaskan politicians of the day.  At around the same time, Alaska eliminated its state income tax.  Hammond is often erroneously credited for this;  in fact, he was actually staunchly opposed to the idea.  The elimination of the income tax was actually championed by Randolph, who persuaded his fellow legislators to pass the bill after mounting an initiative to force a public vote should the legislature not act.  A 1980 episode of the public television program Alaska Review (currently held in the collections of the Alaska Film Archives) prominently featured an edited "debate" between Hammond and Randolph on the subject, centered on the fact that Alaska faced a one-billion-dollar budget surplus that year.

As governor, Hammond advocated for fiscal responsibility, and introduced an amendment to the Alaska Constitution limiting state spending.  This was mocked by one legislator as "Spendy Limitation," with an accompanying elegant and obfuscatory statement mimicking Hammond's unique way with the English language.  He advocated for another constitutional amendment providing for governors to serve a single 6-year term without possibility of further service.  He felt it would allow governors a free hand in accomplishing their goals.  He also championed a program which opened large amounts of state-owned lands near Delta Junction for agricultural use.  While greater aspects of the program have been variously condemned as a "boondoggle" over the years, Delta Junction has managed to emerge as one of the larger agricultural producing communities in Alaska.  He also vigorously fought with the legislature over power struggles between the two branches of government, culminating with four proposed constitutional amendments on the 1980 ballot, all of which failed by large margins.

Later life

After his tenure as governor, Hammond continued to be active in public life. He advocated for environmentally and fiscally responsible government, and individual civic responsibility. Hammond wrote articles for newspapers in Alaska, and appeared in public service announcements on television.  He hosted a television series called Jay Hammond's Alaska from 1985 to 1992.  Hammond survived a rafting accident on August 6, 1988, while shooting an episode of the series on the Tana River in Wrangell-St. Elias National Park.  Killed in the accident were Larry Holmstrom, the show's executive producer, Holmstrom's daughter Maria, and cameraman Ronald Eagle.  Three others on the raft besides Hammond also survived, including one who also fell into the water of the Class IV river.

Hammond wrote three autobiographies, Tales of Alaska's Bush Rat Governor: The Extraordinary Autobiography of Jay Hammond, Wilderness Guide and Reluctant Politician, Chips from the Chopping Block: More Tales from Alaska's Bush Rat Governor and Diapering The Devil: How Alaska Helped Staunch Befouling by Mismanaged Oil Wealth; a Lesson for Other Rich Nations.  The latter book, published in 2011, was co-edited by Hammond's granddaughter Lauren Stanford.  Hammond also wrote the preface to Brother Asaiah, As Remembered by Martha Ellen Anderson and Friends, a memoir of the life of Homer businessman and peace activist Brother Asaiah Bates, which was published in 2006 following the deaths of both Bates and Hammond.

Hammond's last major public appearances were in early 2004, centered around the Conference of Alaskans convened by governor Frank Murkowski.  Murkowski, recalling the spirit of the constitutional convention, assembled fifty-five delegates from across Alaska to meet at the University of Alaska Fairbanks to tackle specific questions regarding Alaska's fiscal future.  Apart from launching the political career of Mark Neuman, who proclaimed himself to be one of the few ordinary people amongst the delegates and who was elected to the state house later that year, little was accomplished by the conference in the end.  Hammond spent much of the conference holding court outside of the Wood Center ballroom where sessions were held, espousing his own solutions, which included doubling the amount of the Permanent Fund dividend and restoring the state income tax, the latter of which was strongly opposed by Murkowski.  The delegates responded to Hammond by endorsing an income tax proposal, which delegate Clark Gruening described as a "declaration of independence" from Murkowski.  Several weeks after the conference, Hammond spoke before Commonwealth North, proclaiming that he would spend $50,000 of his own money if necessary to campaign for his dividend and income tax plan.

Death
Hammond lived at his homestead on Lake Clark, until his death at age 83 on August 2, 2005. According to his wife, Bella, he died peacefully in his sleep.

References

External links

Biographical
 
 Jay Hammond at 100 Years of Alaska's Legislature
Photos from Alaska's Digital Archives

 Hammond, pre-politics – Hammond standing by his airplane.
 House of Representatives of the 1st Legislature – Hammond is third from left in the third row back.
 Inauguration – Hammond speaking at his inauguration, 1974.  Bella Hammond is to his left; Jay Rabinowitz is at right.
 with Gerald Ford – Governor Hammond with U.S. President Gerald Ford, U.S. Senator Ted Stevens and U.S. Representative Don Young at Eielson Air Force Base, November 29, 1975.
 Good Morning America – Hammond being interviewed by David Hartman on Good Morning America.
 with Chris Pearson – Hammond with Yukon premier Christopher Pearson at the Alaska-Yukon border in May 1981.
 with George Parks – Hammond helps to celebrate the 99th birthday of George Alexander Parks on May 29, 1982
 Capital move press conference – Alaska's surviving governors (excepting Waino Hendrickson) gather for a press conference on the capital move ballot issue, July 1982.

Latter-period works by Hammond on fiscal issues
 Juneau Empire – Editorial written by Hammond in 2003 on state spending
 Open letter on the Alaska Permanent Fund and state budget deficit

|-

|-

|-

|-

|-

1922 births
2005 deaths
20th-century American politicians
Alaska Independents
Alaska Republicans
United States Marine Corps pilots of World War II
American expatriates in China
American United Methodists
Aviators from Alaska
Bush pilots
Governors of Alaska
Mayors of places in Alaska
Members of the Alaska House of Representatives
Military personnel from Troy, New York
Penn State College of Engineering alumni
People from Bristol Bay Borough, Alaska
People from Lake and Peninsula Borough, Alaska
Politicians from Troy, New York
Presidents of the Alaska Senate
Republican Party governors of Alaska
United States Marines
United States Naval Aviators
University of Alaska Fairbanks alumni
Writers from Alaska